

Roman empire

Poets
 Ephrem the Syrian (306–373), Nisibis, writing in Syriac
 Faltonia Betitia Proba (c. 306/c. 315 – c. 353/c. 366)
 Ausonius (310–395), Bordeaux
 Himerius (315–386), from Bithynia writing in Greek
 Prudentius (348–405/413) in Tarraconensis, writing in Latin
 Claudian (?–404)

Dates Unknown:
 Avienius, Volsinii, Etruria, writing in Latin
 Nonnus, Egypt, writing in Greek
 Quintus Smyrnaeus, writing in Greek
 Symphosius, perhaps North African, writing in Latin
 Tryphiodorus, Egypt, writing in Greek
 Palladas, Alexandria, Egypt, writing in Greek

South Asia
 Kalidasa, writing in Sanskrit
 Amara Sinha, Sanskrit grammarian and poet

China

Poets (by date of birth)
 Tao Yuanming (365/372–427)
 Xie Lingyun (385–433)

Timeline
 365 – Tao Qian , also known as Tao Yuanming 陶淵明, perhaps born this year (died 427)
 385 – Xie Lingyun (died 433)

References

 
04
Poetry